Jitka Chlastáková (born 13 October 1993) is a Czech football midfielder, who currently plays for Western Sydney Wanderers.

She is a member of the Czech national team. She made her debut for the national team on 19 September 2012 in a match against Armenia.

References

External links
 
 
 

1993 births
Living people
Czech women's footballers
Czech expatriate women's footballers
Czech Republic women's international footballers
People from Mělník
FK Bohemians Prague (Střížkov) players
Women's association football midfielders
FK Dukla Prague players
SK Slavia Praha (women) players
AC Sparta Praha (women) players
FF USV Jena players
Western Sydney Wanderers FC (A-League Women) players
Expatriate women's footballers in Germany
Czech expatriate sportspeople in Germany
Frauen-Bundesliga players
Czech Women's First League players
Sportspeople from the Central Bohemian Region
Expatriate women's soccer players in Australia
Czech expatriate sportspeople in Australia